An atmospheric lake is a long-lived pool of water vapor.  Currently, the weather phenomenon is only known to exist over the western Indian Ocean.

References

Water in gas
Atmosphere